Franz Xaver Wagner (politician) (1809–1879), Swiss politician
 Franz Xaver Wagner (inventor) (1837–1907), German inventor
 Franz Xaver Wagner (comedian) (1939–2011), German comedian